

Æthelstan (or Athelstan) was a medieval Bishop of Elmham.

Athelstan was consecrated between 995 and 997 and died in office on 7 October 1001.

References

External links
 

Bishops of Elmham
10th-century births
1001 deaths

Year of birth unknown